Dhekiajuli is a town and a municipal board in Sonitpur district in the state of Assam, India.

Geography

It has an average elevation of 100 metres (328 ft). There are several tea estates in its vicinity. Some of the major ones include Sapoi, Julia, Dibru-Darrang, Tinkhuria and Deckiajuli TE, Panbari TE run by Kanoi Groups of Companies) etc. Orang National Park is 31.7 km west of the main town of Dhekiajuli. The river Brahmaputra crosses the town.

Demographics
 India census, Dhekiajuli has a population of 21,579. Males constitute 51.42% of the population and females 48.58%. Dhekiajuli has an average literacy rate of 81.41%, higher than the national average of 74.04%. Male literacy rate is 85.07% while female literacy rate is 77.54%. 9.58% of the population is under 6 years of age. The town is fairly active in commercial trade centres. There is a daily market and weekly market hosting numerous shop vendors and people who sell their own as well as the local produce. The weekly market is open on Sundays. The town and its shops, except for medical centres and other public services, are officially closed on Tuesdays for restocking supplies.

Languages

Bengali is spoken at 10,748, Assamese at 5,314,  Hindi by 4,028 people, Nepali at 332 and 1,157 people speaks other languages.

Government
Dhekiajuli is part of Tezpur (Lok Sabha constituency).

Currently, the BJP (Bharatiya Janata Party) is the ruling party of Dhekiajuli.

MLA:  Ashok Singhal (BJP)

Assam Violence in December 2014

In December 2014, a series of attacks by militants resulted in deaths of more than 75 people in Assam. The attacks took place in Chirang, Sonitpur and Kokrajhar districts on 23 December 2014. They have been attributed to the Songbijit faction of National Democratic Front of Bodoland, also known as NDFB(S).

The tribal people are mostly work in tea plantations. Some of them are the descendants of labourers brought to Assam by the British colonial rulers, while others are relatively recent migrants from other parts of India. The NDFB claims to represent the Bodo people, who are native to Assam. It has fought a secessionist war with the government for the establishment of a sovereign Bodoland. Although a number of NDFB militants had agreed to ceasefire and peace talks in the 2000s, the NDFB(S) faction led by I. K. Songbijit has refused to give up their militancy.
 
In May, the government had attributed a similar attack on Muslim migrants to NDFB(S). The December attacks, described as one of the worst massacres in the history of North-East India, led to widespread protests by tribal people. The protests turned violent leading to three more deaths in the hands of the police. The tribal people also killed fourteen Bodos in retaliation. On 26 December, the Government of India declared the launch of Operation All Out to eliminate the Bodo militants and deployed as many as 9,000 soldiers of the Indian Army and the Central Reserve Police Force.

Transport 
Dhekiajuli Road railway station is a railway station on Rangiya–Murkongselek section under Rangiya railway division of Northeast Frontier Railway zone.

Education 
The area is fairly occupied by educational institutions. There is a college for Science, Arts and Commerce streams for higher secondary and degree courses as well. Junior colleges have been recently set up near its vicinity as of 2018. Tutorial homes and coaching centres for clearing entrances are rapidly increasing in number. Compared to Science and Commerce streams, the Arts stream is preferred by the students and is therefore much more heavily populated. This is completely a matter of the students' personal preference and has nothing to do with the facilities available. Contrarily, the Science stream in LOKD College is government funded and well-maintained with labs and has a strong faculty.

References

Cities and towns in Sonitpur district
Sonitpur district